Carlos Alberto Pinha da Rocha (born May 2, 1973), or simply Carlos Alberto, is a retired Brazilian professional footballer.

Honours
 Umaglesi Liga champion: 2004.

European club competitions
 UEFA Intertoto Cup 1997 with FC Torpedo-Luzhniki Moscow: 5 games, 2 goals.
 UEFA Cup 2002–03 qualification with FC Dinamo Tbilisi: 2 games.
 UEFA Champions League 2003–04 qualification with FC Dinamo Tbilisi: 2 games.

External links
 

1973 births
People from Joinville
Living people
Brazilian footballers
Brazilian expatriate footballers
Russian Premier League players
Sport Club Internacional players
FC Torpedo Moscow players
FC Torpedo-2 players
FC Dinamo Tbilisi players
FC Arsenal Tula players
Expatriate footballers in Russia
Association football midfielders
Association football forwards
Sportspeople from Santa Catarina (state)